Mikhail Valeryevich Zharinov (born 25 January 1975) is a former Russian professional footballer.

Club career
He made his professional debut in the Russian Second Division in 1993 for FC Dynamo-2 Moscow.

Honours
 Russian Premier League bronze: 1997.

European club competitions
With FC Dynamo Moscow.

 UEFA Intertoto Cup 1997: 4 games.
 UEFA Cup 2001–02: 1 game.

References

1975 births
Footballers from Moscow
Living people
Russian footballers
Association football defenders
FC Dynamo Stavropol players
FC Dynamo Moscow players
Russian Premier League players
FC Anzhi Makhachkala players
FC Elista players
FC Khimki players